Joseph Ofahengaue (born 15 September 1995), is a Tonga international rugby league professional footballer who plays as a  and  for the Wests Tigers in the NRL.

He previously played for the Brisbane Broncos in the National Rugby League, and has played at representative level for Queensland in State of Origin.

Background
Born in Auckland, New Zealand, Ofahengaue is of Tongan descent, and moved to Australia as a 9-year old.

Ofahengaue played his junior rugby league for the Ipswich Brothers and attended Forest Lake State High School and St Peter Claver College alongside fellow NRL players Tautau Moga and Anthony Milford.

Ofahengaue is the nephew of Tongan-born Australian Wallabies rugby union player Viliami Ofahengaue.

Playing career

Early career
In 2012, he played for the Sydney Roosters SG Ball team.

From 2013 to 2015, Ofahengaue played for the Brisbane Broncos' NYC team. 

On 3 May 2014, Ofahengaue played for the Queensland under-20s team against the New South Wales under-20s team, playing off the interchange bench in the 30-8 loss at Penrith Stadium. On 5 October 2014, Ofahengaue played in the Broncos Holden Cup Grand final against the Junior New Zealand Warriors, starting at prop in the 34-32 loss. On 18 October 2014, he played for the Junior Kangaroos against the Junior Kiwis, starting at prop in the 15-14 loss at Mt Smart Stadium.

2015
In round 2 of the 2015 NRL season, Ofahengaue made his NRL debut for the Brisbane Broncos against the Cronulla-Sutherland Sharks, playing off the interchange bench in the 10-2 win at Shark Park. On 2 May 2015, Ofahengaue again played for the Junior Kangaroos against Junior Kiwis, starting at prop in the 22-20 win at Robina Stadium. On 1 June 2015, Ofahengaue re-signed with the Broncos on a two-year contract. On 14 September 2015, Ofahengaue was named at prop in the 2015 NYC Team of the Year. On 4 October 2015, in the Broncos 2015 NRL Grand Final against Queensland rivals the North Queensland Cowboys, Ofahengaue played off the interchange bench in the 17-16 heartbreaking golden point extra time loss. Ofahengaue finished his debut year in the NRL with him playing in 14 matches for the Broncos in the 2015 NRL season. On 17 October 2015, Ofahengaue played for Tonga against the Cook Islands in their Asia-Pacific Qualifier for the 2017 Rugby League World Cup, starting at lock in the 28-8 win at Campbelltown Stadium.

2016
On 12 January, Ofahengaue was selected in the Queensland Maroons emerging squad. In February, he was involved in the Maroons camp breach as he was one of the designated drivers alongside Dale Copley as they were with 8 other players such as Anthony Milford, Cameron Munster, Valentine Holmes and Dylan Napa who broke the camp midnight curfew and partied on into the night after a drinking session at the Story Bridge Hotel. Ofahengaue and Copley, however weren’t banned.

In round 7 against the Newcastle Knights, Ofahengaue scored his first NRL career try in the 53-0 demolished win at Suncorp Stadium. On 7 May 2016, Ofahengaue played for Tonga against Samoa in the 2016 Polynesian Cup, starting at lock in the 18-6 loss at Parramatta Stadium. Later into the season, Ofahengaue found himself behind in the pecking order in the forward stocks in the likes of Jai Arrow and Tevita Pangai Junior and was languishing in the Queensland Cup, playing for the Souths Logan Magpies for the rest of the year after round 21. Ofahengaue finished the 2016 NRL season with him playing in 16 matches and scoring 1 try.

2017
Ofahengaue had to appear in court in April after he was caught on CCTV footage cheating in a game of poker at the Treasury Casino by slipping a $100 chip under a $15 chip while the dealer was looking away and later copped a $400 fine with no conviction of fraud.

In round 8 against the South Sydney Rabbitohs, Ofahengaue made his return to the Broncos top squad, playing off the interchange bench in the 25-24 win at ANZ Stadium. On 8 May 2017, Ofahengaue played for Tonga against Fiji in a Pacific Test, starting at lock in the 26-24 win at Campbelltown Stadium. On 19 June 2017, Ofahengaue extended his contract with the Broncos to the end of the 2019 season. Ofahengaue finished the 2017 NRL season with him playing in 16 matches and scoring 1 try for the Broncos. On 5 October 2017, Ofahengaue was selected in the 24-man Tonga squad for the 2017 Rugby League World Cup. Ofahengaue only played in one match in the tournament which was against Lebanon, starting at prop in the 24-22 win at AMI Stadium in Christchurch.

2018
After showing some powerhouse performances in the earlier rounds of the season, Ofahengaue skyrocketed in contention for the Queensland Maroons as an interchange option but instead stuck with Tonga for the time being. Y On 23 June 2018, Ofahengaue was selected for Tonga to play in the 2018 Pacific test against Samoa, playing off the interchange bench in the 38-22 win at Campbelltown Stadium. Ofahengaue finished his best season up to date in the 2018 NRL season with him playing in 24 matches and scoring 3 tries. On 20 October 2018, Ofahengaue was selected for Tonga to play in their historical first test against Australia, playing off the interchange bench in the 34-16 loss at Mt Smart Stadium.

2019
Ofahengaue was selected to play for Queensland in the 2019 State of Origin series.  Ofahengaue played in two of the matches in the series which New South Wales won 2-1.  Ofahengaue made 20 appearances for Brisbane in the 2019 NRL season as the club finished 8th on the table and qualified for the finals.  Ofahengaue played in the club's elimination final against Parramatta which Brisbane lost 58-0 at the new Western Sydney Stadium.  The defeat was the worst in Brisbane's history and also the biggest finals defeat in history.  Ofahengaue was also placed on report during the match after hitting Parramatta player Blake Ferguson in the head with a swinging arm. Ofahengaue was a 
part of Tonga’s historic victory over Australia in November, playing off the Interchange Bench.

2020
On 26 January, Ofahengaue was charged by Queensland police for a traffic infringement. He was found asleep behind the wheel of a stationary vehicle. The Brisbane Broncos issued a statement to say the club is “aware of a motor vehicle-related offence involving forward Joe Ofahengaue, The NRL’s Integrity Unit was immediately informed of the incident and the Broncos are working with authorities on the matter".

On 28 February, Ofahengaue was suspended for two matches by Brisbane. Brisbane CEO Paul White spoke to the media saying, "The Broncos took the decision to stand down the player after taking into consideration that it was not his first driving offence in recent years. Joe is really disappointed in himself and very remorseful for what he has done. As a club, our goal is to set a standard for our players and Joe understands that he must pay a price for his actions that night."

Ofahengaue made 15 appearances for Brisbane in the 2020 NRL season as the club suffered their worst ever year on the field, culminating in the club's first Wooden Spoon.

On 29 November, he signed a three-year deal to join the Wests Tigers starting in 2021.

2021

In round 1 of the 2021 NRL season, he made his debut for Wests Tigers  in a 30-12 loss against Canberra.

He played a total of 23 games for the Wests Tigers in the 2021 as the club finished 13th and missed the finals.

2022
Despite Wests Tigers collecting the wooden spoon, Ofahengaue finished ninth in the competition for most tackles made, second in decoy runs, and tenth in runs made. He came 4th in the NRL's Hard Work Index, where he was described as having, "arguably the best year of his career". One of two players to appear in every game of Wests Tigers season, he was awarded the Kelly-Barnes Medal as the best player for the club.

At season's end, Ofahengaue signed a contract extension to remain at the club until the end of 2025. Incoming coach Tim Sheens said, "We’ve brought several younger players through the pathways this season, with more to come, and Joe has played a role in their development. He’s a player they look up to and are comfortable going to for advice. Like the younger guys, he too is always challenging himself to improve, and that’s exciting for all of us."

References

External links

Wests Tigers profile
Brisbane Broncos profile
Broncos profile
NRL profile
2017 RLWC profile

1995 births
Living people
Brisbane Broncos players
Ipswich Jets players
Junior Kangaroos players
New Zealand emigrants to Australia
New Zealand sportspeople of Tongan descent
New Zealand rugby league players
Rugby league locks
Rugby league players from Auckland
Rugby league props
Souths Logan Magpies players
Tonga national rugby league team players
Wests Tigers players
Queensland Rugby League State of Origin players
Australian sportspeople of Tongan descent
Rugby league players from Queensland
Sportsmen from Queensland
21st-century Australian people